Alan Aerts is a world powerlifting and benchpress champion, born May 6, 1956.  Aerts has polycythemia, a fatal blood disease.  He is also the former owner and operator of the largest vending machine business in the San Jose, California area, Custom Vending Systems.  Aerts served on the city council of Monte Sereno, California.

Powerlifting and bench press

Alan holds numerous powerlifting and benchpress championships and records in both open and master's competitions, including California, US, and World champion.

Alan Aerts serves as a California state powerlifting referee.  He also serves as the World Powerlifting Federation records chairman.

His wife, Bonnie Aerts, is also a powerlifting and benchpress champion and bodybuilder, holding the United States Powerlifting Federation bench press record in her weight class in 2006.

Polycythemia
Aerts has a rare blood disease called polycythemia, which causes the body to produce excess red blood cells.  Although the disease can be treated for a time, this disease is always fatal.  Despite this condition, Aerts continues to compete in powerlifting and bench press competitions, and has become world champion in his weight class after being diagnosed with the disease.

Public citizen
Aerts was prominent in Monte Sereno, California where he resided in the 1990s and early 2000s. In 2006 he was awarded "Citizen of the Year" by the city of Campbell, California.  He ran for Monte Sereno City Council 2006, and was a commissioner (?-2006) and a city councilman (2007, 2008) for the City of Monte Sereno, California.  He has been a very generous philanthropist, donating significant money and time to charities including Guide Dogs for the Blind, Special Olympics, and local charities.

His business, "Custom Vending Systems," was named "Business of the Year" by the city of Campbell, California in 2005, and was the leading vending machine business in Silicon Valley. In 2013 Aerts retired from vending, sold his business, and moved to Nevada.

After years of creating elaborate Christmas season displays (including cookies and punch for visiting children) at his home, with decorations costing in excess of $150,000 and drawing tens of thousands of visitors, Aerts became the target of neighborhood controversy over the traffic, parking, and other disruption to the neighborhood resulting from all the attention to the displays.  Aerts attempted to alleviate concerns by hiring private security to help with traffic management on the four-home court where he lived.

Local residents signed a petition, and the city council voted in an ordinance, often referred to as the "Alan Aerts" ordinance, that prevented the popular display starting in 2003.  In protest, the Aerts' raised a statue of The Grinch, which garnered the event attention and coverage in media including The Associated Press, The New York Times, The Daily Show on Comedy Central, MSNBC, Jimmy Kimmel Live!, National Public Radio (NPR), and local newspapers and television shows.

References

1956 births
Living people
American strength athletes
American powerlifters
American male weightlifters
Place of birth missing (living people)
Sportspeople from Santa Clara County, California
People from Campbell, California
People from Monte Sereno, California